The Müller Mountains are a mountain range in Central Borneo. The mountains extend along the northern border of Kalimantan, the Indonesia-administered parts of Borneo. The mountains are the source of the Kapuas River. The range is named after George Müller, a German engineer who traversed the mountains in the 1820s.

References

See also 
List of mountain ranges

Mountain ranges of Indonesia
Borneo montane rain forests